Claude Heim (29 September 1912 – 28 May 2002) was a French athlete. He competed in the men's long jump at the 1936 Summer Olympics.

References

1912 births
2002 deaths
Athletes (track and field) at the 1936 Summer Olympics
French male long jumpers
Olympic athletes of France
Place of birth missing